The Gospel According to Water is the fifteenth studio album by American musician and producer Joe Henry. It was released in November 15, 2019 under EarMusic Records.

Critical reception
The Gospel According to Water was met with universal acclaim reviews from critics. At Metacritic, which assigns a weighted average rating out of 100 to reviews from mainstream publications, this release received an average score of 85, based on 6 reviews

In a year-end essay for Slate, Ann Powers cited The Gospel According to Water as one of her favorite albums from 2019 and proof that the format is not dead but rather undergoing a "metamorphosis". She added that concept albums had reemerged through the culturally-relevant autobiographical narratives of artists such as Henry, who, "faced with a daunting cancer diagnosis ... wrote a whole new hymnal, in the form of a song journal written at 4 a.m."

Track listing

Charts

Release history

References

2019 albums
Joe Henry albums